Choenyi Tsering (born 15 May 1986) is a Chinese actress and singer of Tibetan descent. She is best known for her roles as Princess Aliya on Love Yunge from the Desert (2013) and Zhang Lihua/ Zhu Gui'er on Heroes in Sui and Tang Dynasties (2013) and also starred in a number of films, including Zhanian Instrument (1999), Women Who Know How to Flirt Are the Luckiest (2013), Zhong Kui: Snow Girl and the Dark Crystal (2014), and Soul on a String (2017).

Early life and education
Choenyi Tsering was born in Ngari Prefecture, Tibet Autonomous Region, China, on 15 May 1986. She aspired to act from an early age. She graduated from Tibet University.

Acting career
At the age of 13, Tsering appeared in an advertisement for a Tibetan medicine. It was her first ever advertising campaign as a model. She made her film debut in Zhanian Instrument (1999), playing Gesang. In 2002, she attended the Tourism Ambassador of Tibet trials and won the Champions. In the fellowing year, she got the first place in the "Fifty-six Golden Flower Beauty Pageant of National Minorities" contest. After playing minor roles in various films and television series, Tsering received her first leading role in a series called Changpiao Zhuangge (2008).

In 2009, she won the top place in Come on! Oriental angel, a Talent Show program aired on Dragon Television. In 2010, Tsering became the Penghu Islands Tourist Image Propaganda Ambassador. That same year, she appeared uncredited in the biographical historical television series Huang Yanpei as a journalist.

Her first major film role was in Wuye Paimen (2011). It was released on 26 August 2011. In 2013, she had key supporting role as Princess Aliya in Love Yunge from the Desert, for which she received praise. That same year, Tsering was cast as Zhang Lihua/ Zhu Gui'er in Heroes in Sui and Tang Dynasties, a television series based on Chu Renhuo's historical novel Sui Tang Yanyi. She had a minor role as Jia Jia in Pang Ho-Cheung's romance film Women Who Know How to Flirt Are the Luckiest.

In 2014, Tsering appeared as Du Juan in the critically acclaimed shenmo television series New Mad Monk, a sequel to The Legend of Crazy Monk. She got a small role as a Western beauty in the fantasy action adventure film Zhong Kui: Snow Girl and the Dark Crystal. In 2016, she had a cameo appearance in Ice Fantasy, adapted from Guo Jingming's bestselling novel of the same title. The series was broadcast in July 2016 on Hunan Satellite Television. At the end of that same year, she sung a song with Tashi Dhondup on the CCTV New Year's Gala.

In 2017, Tsering co-starred with Kimba and Siano Dudiom Zahi in Soul on a String as the Qiong, a Tibetan shepherdess. In 2019, she appeared in a supporting role in Daniel Lee's adventure drama film The Climbers.

Filmography

Film

TV series

Drama

Singles

References

External links

Choenyi Tsering Douban  
Choenyi Tsering Mtime 

1986 births
People from Ngari Prefecture
Living people
21st-century Tibetan women singers
Tibetan actresses
Tibet University alumni
Chinese film actresses
Chinese television actresses
21st-century Chinese actresses
21st-century Chinese women singers